Thomas Trevor may refer to:
 Sir Thomas Trevor (1586–1656), English judge who delivered the judgment against John Hampden in the Ship Money case
 Sir Thomas Trevor, 1st Baronet (c. 1612–1676), his son, Member of Parliament for Monmouth and Tregony
 Thomas Trevor, 1st Baron Trevor (1658–1730), English judge, Attorney General and Chief Justice of Common Pleas
 Thomas Trevor, 22nd Baron Dacre (1808–1890), British politician, MP for Hertfordshire
 Thomas Trevor (curator) (born 1962), British art curator and writer